Vidhana Soudha in Bangalore, India, is the seat of the state legislature of Karnataka. It is constructed in a style described as Neo-Dravidian, and incorporates elements of various Dravidian styles. Construction was started in 1952 and completed in 1956.

History
The two houses of legislature of the princely state of Mysore, the legislative assembly and the legislative council, were established in 1881 and 1907 respectively. Sessions of the two houses took place in Mysore (with joint sessions taking place in the Bangalore Town Hall) until India's independence from British rule on 15 August 1947, when Mysore acceded to India. The state's capital was shifted to Bangalore; the two houses moved into Attara Kacheri, a British-built building in Cubbon Park that housed the High Court of Mysore.

A need was felt for more spacious quarters for the legislature than Attara Kacheri, and in April 1951. The foundation stone of the building was laid by Jawaharlal Nehru, the first Prime Minister of India, on 13 July 1951. The structure was planned to be a two-storeyed building housing the assembly and the council.

Kengal Hanumanthaiah succeeded K. C. Reddy as Chief Minister of Mysore after a 1952 election. Calling the existing plan a "plain and simple type of American architecture", Hanumanthaiah ordered extensive revisions to produce "a work of art in keeping with the tradition of Mysore State". Apart from house chambers, the revised plan included government offices, archives, a library and a banquet hall. Construction of the building was completed in 1956. Hanumanthiah personally supervised and ordered several particular aspects of the construction; one of them was to inscribe "Government Work Is God's Work" and its Kannada equivalent on the entablature of the front facade. The final design was meant to dwarf the British-built Attara Kacheri, currently the seat of the Karnataka High Court, opposite which Vidhana Soudha was being built.

Construction 
White granite from Magadi and Turuvekere was used in the construction. Around 5,000 labourers and 1,500 stonecutters were employed.

Estimates of construction costs for the original two-storied structure stood at 33 lakh (3.3 million) rupees. The final cost of construction of the redesigned building was 180 lakh (18 million) rupees.

Architecture
Built with granite, Vidhana Soudha is the largest legislative building in India. The architecture includes elements of styles from the mediaeval Chalukya, Hoysala and Vijayanagara empires of Karnataka. The central dome,  in diameter, is crowned by a likeness of the State Emblem of India.

The phrase "Government Work is God's Work" and its Kannada equivalent "Sarkarada kelasa devara kelasa" (in Kannada script as "ಸರ್ಕಾರದ ಕೆಲಸ ದೇವರ ಕೆಲಸ") are inscribed on the entablature. In 1996, the inscription inspired a visiting US state governor, George Voinovich of Ohio, to propose etching "With God, all things are possible" onto the Ohio Statehouse, prompting a high-profile lawsuit.

The cost of construction at that time wasc . Currently, annual maintenance cost is more than  including repairs, painting, and other miscellaneous expenses.

Replicas

Vikasa Soudha

The Karnataka government constructed a replica named Vikasa Soudha to the south of the building. Initiated by the then Chief Minister S. M. Krishna and inaugurated in February 2005, it is intended to be an annexe building, housing some of the ministries and legislative offices.

Suvarna Vidhana Soudha

The Suvarna Vidhana Soudha is the legislature building of the State of Karnataka in Belgaum in the Belgaum district of Northern Karnataka. It was inaugurated on 11 October 2012 by President Pranab Mukherjee.

Location
It is located on Ambedkar Veedhi or Dr Ambedkar Rd, Seshadripuram. Across from Vidhana Soudha is the High Court of Karnataka. Both buildings are in Cubbon Park, which is located near the Karnataka State Lawn Tennis Association (KSLTA).

References

External links

 Vidhana Soudha
 vidhanasoudha.com

Government buildings completed in 1956
Buildings and structures in Bangalore
Legislative buildings in India
Tourist attractions in Bangalore
Karnataka Legislature
20th-century architecture in India